Grace-Evangeline Mason (born October 1994) is a British composer of contemporary classical music.

Biography
Mason studied composition at the Royal Northern College of Music, Manchester, under Professor Emily Howard and Professor Gary Carpenter, where she held a scholarship and was awarded the Rosamond Prize (2016). She began her studies at the college as a member of their Junior Department, during which time she was also a member of the National Youth Orchestra of Great Britain and won the 2013 BBC Proms Inspire Young Composer Competition for her piece Convergence, for which she has since become an ambassador. She subsequently studied at Somerville College, Oxford.

In 2017, whilst still an undergraduate, she was co-commissioned by BBC Radio 4's Front Row programme and The Proms to compose her work entitled River, which was written to celebrate the 300th anniversary of George Frideric Handel's Water Music. The piece was premiered live on BBC Radio 4 from a stationary boat on the River Thames by London Early Opera, imitating the premiere performance of Water Music 300 years previously. River was subsequently performed at the Proms by Royal Northern Sinfonia under Nicholas McGegan in Kingston upon Hull, which was the first time the Proms had included a concert outside London since 1930. In 2018, the piece received its United States premiere at the Norfolk Chamber Music Festival by the Philharmonia Baroque Orchestra.

In November 2017, the BBC Philharmonic performed her orchestral work Kintsukuroi: (Golden Repair), conducted by Mark Heron, in a special joint concert with Psappha New Music Ensemble for BBC Radio 3 broadcast as part of the biennial New Music North West Festival.

Mason is the recipient of prizes and awards such as the Royal Liverpool Philharmonic's Christopher Brooks Prize 2017 and the prestigious Royal Philharmonic Society Composition Prize 2018.

Her debut chamber opera in one act entitled The Yellow Wallpaper, for which Mason wrote the libretto based on the short story of the same name by Charlotte Perkins Gilman, was produced by the Helios Collective to receive its premiere performance at the English National Opera's Lilian Baylis House in 2016.

Mason's music has been included in events and festivals such as BBC Radio 3's Young Artist Day, in which her work "Diamond Dust II" for Clarinet in Bb and Piano was broadcast live, her setting of Psalm 93, "The Lord Is", was premiered in the London Festival of Contemporary Church Music 2017 by the Sarum Consort, and in the Open Circuit Festival 2016 in which her piece "Let The Rain Kiss You", inspired by the poem "April Rain Song", by Langston Hughes was performed by trombonist, John Kenny.

Her music has been performed by members of the BBC Symphony Orchestra, the Aurora Orchestra, and Ensemble 10/10. In 2017, Mason was selected to write her orchestral piece Beneath the Silken Silence for the London Symphony Orchestra as part of their Panufnik Composer's Scheme, she was then subsequently commissioned to write her work 'FAFAIA' (2018) for their Community Choir.

She was named in The Times 2020 Calendar of the Arts as the classical music 'Face To Watch.'

Selected works

Orchestral works
The Imagined Forest (2021) – for orchestra
Fireworks (2018) – for soprano voice and orchestra
Kintsukuroi: (Golden Repair) (2016) – for orchestra

Solo/chamber works
My Thoughts Fly In At Your Window (2020) – for large chamber ensemble
Midnight Spires (2019) – for string quartet
Glass Cathedrals (2019) – for harp
Into The Abyss, I Throw Roses (2018) – for string trio
Upon Weightless Wings (2018) – for large chamber ensemble
River (2017) – for baroque chamber orchestra

Choral works
A Song of Christ's Glory (2019) – for SATB choir
Fafaia (2018) – for SATB choir and piano
The Lord Is (2015) – for SATB choir
Faint Flight (2014) – for SATB choir

Opera
The Yellow Wallpaper (2016) – chamber opera in one act

References

External links
Official Website
Grace-Evangeline Mason on Soundcloud

1994 births
Living people
Alumni of Somerville College, Oxford
British classical composers
20th-century classical composers
Women classical composers
English composers
Women opera composers
English opera composers
20th-century British composers
20th-century English women musicians
British women composers
Alumni of the Royal Northern College of Music
21st-century English women musicians
People from Wolverhampton
20th-century women composers
21st-century composers
21st-century women composers
21st-century British composers